Hanikase  is a village in Võru Parish, Võru Parish in southeastern Estonia.

References

 

Villages in Võru County